Quotidien is a French television show, first broadcast 12 September 2016 on the channel TMC. It is presented by Yann Barthès.

History
On 9 May 2016, Yann Barthès announced that he was leaving Canal+'s Le Petit Journal, a programme which he had presented since it began in 2004. On the same day the TF1 Group announced that it had recruited Barthès to present two new programmes: a daily show on its channel TMC and a weekly show on the TF1 channel. Canal+ later announced that Barthès would be replaced as presenter of Le Petit Journal by Cyrille Eldin.

The first episode of Quotidien, broadcast 12 September 2016, featured a guest appearance by the singer Vanessa Paradis who opened the series. It also featured an interview with the Socialist Party politician and former Minister of Justice Christiane Taubira, an appearance by the actor Valérie Lemercier, and a live performance by the band La Femme. The show was watched by 1.3 million viewers, representing 6.3% of the total audience.

Controversies
Catherine Deneuve, on March 16, 2017, defended director Roman Polanski, accused of raping a 13-year-old minor whom he allegedly drugged, arguing that the victim "did not look her age".

In 2020, Yann Barthès was accused of not reacting to the racist words of the former French president Nicolas Sarkozy.

In March 2021, Quotidien was criticized for complacency during an interview of the journalist Patrick Poivre d'Arvor, accused of sexual harassment and rape.

Starring

References

External links
 

2016 French television series debuts
French television news shows
TMC (TV channel) original programming